The Astounding Eyes of Rita is an album by oud player and composer Anouar Brahem recorded in Italy in 2008 and released on the ECM label in 2009.

Reception 

Writing for The Guardian, reviewer John Fordham observed "In recent years, Brahem's work has been more refined and reflective than groove-inclined, but this vivacious quartet set marks a return to the chemistry of Thimar, and it's a richly varied and often thrilling piece of world-jazz". Writing for All About Jazz, John Kelman noted "After two discs of sparer chamber music, it's great to hear Brahem back with a pulse; but with Meyer, Gesing, and Yassine as partners, he's retained the elusive mystery of albums like Le Pas du Chat Noir (2002), making The Astounding Eyes of Rita his most aesthetically unified album to date".

Track listing 
All compositions by Anouar Brahem
 "The Lover of Beirut" - 7:44   
 "Dance with Waves" - 3:56   
 "Stopover at Djibouti" - 6:34   
 "The Astounding Eyes of Rita" - 8:41   
 "Al Birwa" - 4:51   
 "Galilee Mon Amour" - 7:17   
 "Waking State" - 7:48   
 "For No Apparent Reason" - 6:35

Personnel
 Anouar Brahem - oud
 Klaus Gesing - bass clarinet
 Björn Meyer - bass
 Khaled Yassine - darbouka, bendir

References 

ECM Records albums
Anouar Brahem albums
2009 albums
Albums produced by Manfred Eicher